Paz Echeverría (born 7 May 1985) is a Chilean professional golfer.

She is only the second golfer from Chile to have a tour card on the LPGA Tour after Nicole Perrot.

For the 2016 season, she is playing on the second-tier Symetra Tour since she only earned conditional status on the LPGA Tour and hopes to earn enough world ranking points to qualify for the 2016 Olympics.

Team appearances
Amateur
Espirito Santo Trophy (representing Chile): 2002, 2004, 2006, 2008, 2010

References

External links

Chilean female golfers
LPGA Tour golfers
Sportspeople from Santiago
1985 births
Living people